The Interstate 90 floating bridges is the common name for the twin floating bridges that carry a section of Interstate 90 across Lake Washington between Seattle and Mercer Island in the U.S. state of Washington. They are the:

 Lacey V. Murrow Memorial Bridge, which carries the highway's eastbound traffic and is the second longest floating bridge in the world
 Homer M. Hadley Memorial Bridge, which carries the highway's westbound traffic and is the fifth longest floating bridge in the world; it is planned to also carry light rail trains

Interstate 90
Pontoon bridges in the United States